The Fite-Williams-Ligon House is a historic mansion in Carthage, Tennessee in the United States.

Location
It is located at 212 Fite Avenue West in Carthage, a small town in Smith County, Tennessee. It sits on a bluff half a mile away from the Cumberland River.

History
The two-storey house was built circa 1850. It was designed in the Italianate architectural style, with bricks painted in white and a gable roof. By 1877, a gabled ell and hall were added to the main building. It was remodelled circa 1920.

During the Civil War, the house was used as a hospital for the Union Army. After the war, it belonged to Robert M. King. In 1873, it was purchased by Confederate Colonel John Armenus Fite, who lived there with his wife, two daughters and a black servant. By 1905, the house was acquired by J.W. Williams, the president of the Carthage Packet Company. It was purchased by L.A. Ligon in 1919. After Ligon's death in 1947, the house was purchased by his daughter Margaret and her husband, J.T. Westmoreland. In 1996, it was purchased by their granddaughter.

Architectural significance
It has been listed on the National Register of Historic Places since July 17, 2003.

References

Houses in Smith County, Tennessee
Houses on the National Register of Historic Places in Tennessee
Italianate architecture in Tennessee
National Register of Historic Places in Smith County, Tennessee